Mărășești is a small town in Vrancea County, Western Moldavia, Romania. It administers six villages: Călimănești, Haret, Modruzeni, Pădureni, Siretu and Tișița.

Geography
The town is located in the eastern part of the county, on the border with Galați County. Mărășești lies on the right bank of the river Siret, which separates it from Galați County, in the area where the Siret receives the waters of the rivers Șușița and Zăbrăuț.

History

King Milan I of Serbia was born in Mărășești on 22 August 1854.

In 1917 during World War I, the Battle of Mărășești between the Kingdom of Romania and the German Empire was fought near the town. It was the last major battle between the German Empire and the Kingdom of Romania on the Romanian front during World War I. A mausoleum containing the remains of 5,073 Romanian soldiers was built to commemorate the Romanian victory.

Maria Zaharia (1905–1917) was born in Pădureni village. She acted as an impromptu artillery observer for the Romanian Army and was killed during the Battle of Mărășești. She is buried at the Mausoleum of Mărășești, the only child who is laid to rest there.

See also
 Battle of Mărășești
 Mausoleum of Mărășești

References

External links

 

Towns in Romania
Populated places in Vrancea County
Localities in Western Moldavia